Igram van Achelen (1528, 's-Hertogenbosch – 18 October 1604, Mechelen) was a Dutch statesman.

Van Achelen studied law in Deventer, Leiden and Leuven. In 1561 he married the niece of president Viglius van Aytta. In 1550 he was nominated member of the Friesian Regional Council by Charles V. In 1570 he became president of the Friesian State Council.

A memorial column from 1574 expresses the gratitude of the province for the construction of the dikes after the great floods of 1570. Later, when the Council announced a decree deseating Don John of Austria, he was suspected to take side for the latter. Van Achelen was incarcerated and released soon thereafter. He redeemed himself only eight years later, when he was awarded the knightly insignia. He became a member of the Privy Council of the Habsburg Netherlands, then on 18 August 1598 president of the Great Council of Mechelen.

Sources
 Allgemeine Deutsche Biographie - online version at Wikisource

1528 births
1604 deaths
Dutch politicians
16th-century Dutch people
People from 's-Hertogenbosch
Presidents of the Great Council